The Gujarat Energy Transmission Corporation Limited (GETCO) is an electrical power transmission company in the state of Gujarat, India. It was set up in May 1999 and is registered under the Companies Act of 1956. The company was promoted by the erstwhile Gujarat Electricity Board (GEB) as its wholly owned-subsidiary in the context of liberalization and as a part of efforts towards restructuring of the power sector. The company is now a subsidiary of Gujarat Urja Vikas Nigam, the successor company to the GEB.

Getco at a glance
System Strength (as on 31 March 2020)

See also
 Gujarat Urja Vikas Nigam Limited GUVNL
 Gujarat State Electricity Corporation Limited GSECL
 State Load Dispatch Center SLDC
 Dakshin Gujarat Vij Company Limited DGVCL
 Madhya Gujarat Vij Company Limited MGVCL
 Paschim Gujarat Vij Company Limited PGVCL
 Uttar Gujarat Vij Company Limited UGVCL
 Gujarat Energy Training and Research Institute GETRI

References

External links
 Company website
 www.gseb.com

Companies based in Gujarat
Electric power transmission system operators in India
Energy companies established in 1999
1999 establishments in Gujarat
Indian companies established in 1999